Vladislav Lungu (born 10 April 1977) is a Moldovan former professional footballer.

Club career
Lungu previously played for FC Vorskla Poltava in Ukraine, Celje, Gorica and Maribor in Slovenia, and FC Vaslui in Romania.

International career
Lungu has made eight appearances for the full Moldova national football team.

See also
List of NK Maribor players

References

External links

1977 births
Living people
Moldovan footballers
Association football midfielders
Moldovan expatriate footballers
FC Zimbru Chișinău players
FC Vorskla Poltava players
FC Spartak Vladikavkaz players
Expatriate footballers in Slovenia
NK Celje players
ND Gorica players
Slovenian PrvaLiga players
FC Vaslui players
NK Maribor players
Expatriate footballers in Romania
Expatriate footballers in Ukraine
Moldovan expatriate sportspeople in Ukraine
Expatriate footballers in Russia
Liga I players
Russian Premier League players
Ukrainian Premier League players
Moldova international footballers
FC Nosta Novotroitsk players